The Big Ten Conference is a National Collegiate Athletic Association (NCAA) Division I conference that has sponsored men's ice hockey since the 2013–14 season. At the completion of each regular season, it holds the Big Ten Men's Ice Hockey Tournament to determine its conference champion. The single-elimination tournament includes all seven Big Ten teams: Michigan, Michigan State, Minnesota, Notre Dame, Ohio State, Penn State, and Wisconsin. 

The original tournament format was contested over three days at one host site. This arrangement lasted for the first four tournaments, with the sites split between the Xcel Energy Center in Saint Paul, Minnesota (2014 and 2016) and Joe Louis Arena in Detroit, Michigan (2015 and 2017). Starting with the 2018 tournament, the games have been hosted on campus sites.

Champions

References

External links
Big Ten
Big Ten Tournament Information

Champions, List Of
College ice hockey in the United States lists